Jordan Rhett Tunnicliffe (born 13 October 1993) is an English professional footballer who plays as a defender for National League side Wrexham.

Career

Early career
Born in Nuneaton, Tunnicliffe joined West Bromwich Albion's academy in 2004, and signed as a scholar in June 2010. He left the club in 2012, and trialled with West Ham United that summer before joining Nike Academy. He had an unsuccessful trial with Norwich City in April 2013, and joined Barnsley that summer. He joined Stalybridge Celtic on loan in January 2014. He was released by Barnsley at the end of the 2013–14 season.

He joined Sutton Coldfield Town in August 2014.

Kidderminster Harriers
In November 2014, Tunnicliffe joined Kidderminster Harriers on a deal until the end of the season, with the option to extend his contract by a further season. He joined Hednesford Town on loan until the end of the season in March 2015, but was recalled from his loan the following month. He extended his contract by a further year in May 2015.

Following a hamstring injury, he returned to Sutton Coldfield Town on a month-long loan in February 2016. He signed a one-year contract extension at the end of the season.

He was awarded their Players' Player of the Season award for the 2016–17 season, but turned down the offer of a new contract at the end of the season.

AFC Fylde
In the summer of 2017, Tunnicliffe signed for National League side AFC Fylde. Tunnicliffe's debut for the club came on 5 August, as they drew 2–2 at home to Boreham Wood in the opening game of the season. Tunnicliffe scored his first goal of the season on 16 September 2017 with Fylde's second goal of a 2–2 draw with Eastleigh.

Crawley Town
On 11 July 2019, Tunnicliffe signed for League Two side Crawley Town in July 2019 on a two-year contract. On 3 August 2019, he made his first appearance for the Reds, playing the full 90 minutes away to Carlisle United. He scored his first goal for Crawley on 1 February 2020: the opening goal of a 3–1 League Two victory over Scunthorpe United. He made 45 appearances across the 2019–20 season and scored 1 goal.

Tunnicliffe scored Crawley's final goal of a 3–0 FA Cup third round win over Premier League side Leeds United on 10 January 2021. He was named in the League Two Team of the Year for the 2020–21 season.

Wrexham

On 1 July 2022, it was announced that Tunnicliffe had signed for National League side Wrexham. By 24 August he has only made one substitutes appearance.

International career
He was called up the England C team in May 2017, and made his debut as a late substitute against Panjab later that month.

Personal life
His brother James is also a footballer.

Career statistics

Honours
Individual
EFL League Two Team of the Season: 2020-21

References

1993 births
Living people
English footballers
Association football defenders
West Bromwich Albion F.C. players
Nike Academy players
Barnsley F.C. players
Stalybridge Celtic F.C. players
Sutton Coldfield Town F.C. players
Kidderminster Harriers F.C. players
Hednesford Town F.C. players
AFC Fylde players
Crawley Town F.C. players
Wrexham A.F.C. players
English Football League players
Sportspeople from Nuneaton
National League (English football) players
England semi-pro international footballers